Anke Wöhrer (also spelled Woehrer, née Karstens; born 13 October 1985, in Berchtesgaden) is a German snowboarder. She participated at the 2014 Winter Olympics and 2018 Winter Olympics, earning the silver medal in the women's parallel slalom event in 2014.

References

External links
 
 
 
 
 
 
 

1985 births
Living people
German female snowboarders
Olympic snowboarders of Germany
Olympic silver medalists for Germany
Olympic medalists in snowboarding
Snowboarders at the 2010 Winter Olympics
Snowboarders at the 2014 Winter Olympics
Snowboarders at the 2018 Winter Olympics
Medalists at the 2014 Winter Olympics
People from Berchtesgaden
Sportspeople from Upper Bavaria
21st-century German women